The 1947 Brown Bears football team was an American football team that represented the Brown University during the 1947 college football season.  In its fourth season under head coach Rip Engle, the team compiled a 4–4–1 record and outscored opponents by a total of 185 to 139. The team played its home games at Brown Stadium in Providence, Rhode Island

Schedule

References

Brown
Brown Bears football seasons
Brown Bears football